Devos is a concatenated form of the Dutch-language surname De Vos (meaning "the fox"), common in the Belgian province of West Flanders and French Flanders. DeVos is a version of "De Vos" found in the United States. 

Notable people with the Devos or DeVos name include:

Devos
Danny Devos (born 1959), Belgian body and performance artist
Emmanuelle Devos (born 1964), French actress
Gérard Devos (1903–1972), Belgian footballer
Hendrik Devos (born 1955), Belgian racing cyclist 
Jeanne Devos (born 1935), Belgian nun and missionary in India
Katrien Devos, Belgian-born American plant geneticist 
Laurens Devos born 2000), Belgian table tennis player
Léon Devos (1896–1963), Belgian racing cyclist 
Léon Devos (1897–1974), Belgian painter
 (1926–2015), Belgian opera tenor and music director
Paul Devos (1911–1981), Belgian chess master
Philip-Michael Devos (born 1990), Canadian ice hockey player 
Raymond Devos (1922–2006), Belgian-French humorist
Werner Devos (born 1957), Belgian racing cyclist 
William Devos (1857– aft. 1902), American businessman and Wisconsin politician

DeVos
Bob DeVos (born 1946), American jazz guitarist

DeVos family

Richard DeVos (1926-2018), American businessman, co-founder of Amway, and sports team owner; wife Helen DeVos (née Van Wesep, 1927–2017), American philanthropist
Dick DeVos (born 1955), American  businessman who ran for Governor of Michigan, Richard DeVos' son; wife Betsy DeVos (née Prince, 1958), American businesswoman, former United States Secretary of Education, and Erik Prince's sister
Dan DeVos (born c. 1959), American businessman and sports executive, Richard DeVos' son
Doug DeVos (born 1964), American businessman, Amway President, Richard DeVos' son

Named after Richard DeVos (1926-2018)
DeVos Fieldhouse
DeVos Place Convention Center
Richard and Helen DeVos Foundation

See also 
 De Vos
 Davos, a Swiss municipality
 Davos (disambiguation)
 Devo, an American band
 Devos the Devastator, a Marvel Comics character

References

Dutch-language surnames
Surnames of Belgian origin